Man and His Symbols is the last work undertaken by Carl Jung before his death in 1961. First published in 1964, it is divided into five parts, four of which were written by associates of Jung: Marie-Louise von Franz, Joseph L. Henderson, Aniela Jaffé, and Jolande Jacobi. The book, which contains numerous illustrations, seeks to provide a clear explanation of Jung's complex theories for a wide non-specialist readership.

Jung wrote Part 1, "Approaching the Unconscious," of the book in English:

Origin of the book 
The idea for this work developed in two stages.

In the spring of 1959, the BBC asked journalist (and future politician) John Freeman to interview Carl Gustav Jung at his home in Küsnacht, Switzerland, for the television show Face to face. Forty minutes long, it was broadcast on 22 October 1959. Among those who saw it was Wolfgang Foges, who managed Aldus Books. He considered it a pity that at that time Jung remained very little known to the general public, especially compared to Sigmund Freud. He then begged Freeman to help him convince Jung to express the fundamentals of his thinking in the form of a popularization book.

Freeman returned to Jung's house but Jung then rejected the idea.

Two factors then came into play, which lead Jung to finally accept the offer: the unusual abundance of mail he received as a result of the BBC show as well as a dream he had, in which he  addressed a crowd listening attentively. When Foges asked Jung, a week later, he responded favorably but posed two conditions: that the book be written with some of his collaborators and that Freeman ensure its coordination.

Structure of the book 
Abundantly illustrated, the book consists of five parts:

 Exploration essay of the unconscious (Carl Jung)
 Primitive myths and modern man (Joseph L. Henderson)
 The process of individuation (Marie-Louise von Franz)
 Symbolism in the plastic arts (Aniéla Jaffé)
 Symbols within an individual analysis (Jolande Jacobi).

Jung finished his chapter barely ten days before the onset of the illness that led to his death (this is his very last article) and after he had approved the draft of his collaborators.

After Jung's death, Marie-Louise von Franz assumed the responsibility of taking over the coordination and drafted the conclusion.

Extracts 

 "Modern man does not understand to what extent his 'rationalism' has placed him at the mercy of this underground psychic world. He freed himself from "superstition" (at least he believes so) but in doing so he lost his spiritual values to an alarming degree. His moral and spiritual traditions have disintegrated and he is paying for this collapse with a disarray and dissociation that is rampant throughout the world."
 "Today we talk about 'matter', we describe its physical properties, we conduct laboratory experiments to demonstrate some of its aspects. But the word 'matter' remains a purely intellectual concept, which has no psychic meaning for us. ... Likewise, what was once 'the spirit' is now identified with the intellect. It has deteriorated to fall within the limits of thought egocentric."
 "Despite our proud claim to dominate nature, we are still its victims because we have not yet learned to dominate ourselves."

Editions
A German-language edition of the book, Der Mensch und seine Symbole, has been published by Patmos Verlag. The illustrations included in this edition are in color.

The book was published in France at the same time as the original edition: in 1964.

The reissues remained unchanged, with the same pagination.

The book has been reprinted several times since initial publication, including:
  (Doubleday hardcover, 1964)
  (Dell Publishing paperback, 1968)
  (Picador paperback, 1978)

See also
Twelve Dreams   1981 play by James Lapine  inspired by a case study contained in the book.

References

External links
 Archive for Research in Archetypal Symbolism: A pictorial and written archive of mythological, ritualistic, and symbolic images from all over the world and from all epochs of human history.

Symbolism
Mythology books
1964 non-fiction books
Works by Carl Jung
Books published posthumously